The Princess Diaries, Volume VII and 1/2: Sweet Sixteen Princess is a young adult book in the Princess Diaries series.  Written by Meg Cabot, it was released in 2005 by Harper Collins Publishers and is the third novella in the series.

Plot
Mia doesn’t always have the best luck with parties, so even though it’s her sweet sixteenth, she doesn’t want a birthday bash. As usual, Grand-mère has other ideas, and thinks a reality TV special is just the thing in order to celebrate royally. The whole scheme reeks of Lilly’s doing—Lilly, whose own TV show is still only limited to local cable viewers. Will Mia be able to stop Grand-mère’s plan? Will her friends ever forgive her if she does stop it, since it involves all of them taking the royal jet to Genovia for an extravaganza the likes of which would turn even Paris Hilton green with envy? Why can’t Mia get what she really wants: an evening alone with Michael?

With a little luck, this sweet sixteen princess might just get her wish—a birthday that's royally romantic.

2005 American novels
American young adult novels
American novellas
The Princess Diaries novels
HarperCollins books